The 1939 South Ayrshire by-election was a parliamentary by-election held in the United Kingdom on 20 April 1939 for the House of Commons constituency of South Ayrshire in Scotland.

Previous MP

Previous result

Candidates

Result

Aftermath 
In the 1945 general election,

References

 British Parliamentary Election Results 1918-1949, compiled and edited by F.W.S. Craig (The Macmillan Press 1979)

1939 elections in the United Kingdom
1939 in Scotland
1930s elections in Scotland
Politics of Ayrshire
Ayrshire, South